Nutan Samarth Bahl (4 June 1936 – 21 February 1991), known mononymously as Nutan, was an Indian actress who worked in Hindi films. In a career spanning nearly four decades, she appeared in more than 80 films, mostly as a protagonist, in both big productions and arthouse films that ranged in genre from urban romances, literary adaptations, to psychological and socio-realist dramas. Regarded as one of the finest actors in the history of Indian cinema, Nutan was noted for her naturalistic acting style in parts of conflicted women often deemed unconventional. Her accolades include a record five Filmfare Awards for Best Actress and the Padma Shri by the Government of India in 1974.

Born in Bombay to filmmaker Kumarsen Samarth and film actress Shobhna Samarth, Nutan started her career at the age of 14 in the 1950 film Hamari Beti, directed by her mother. She subsequently starred in such films as Nagina and Hum Log (both 1951). Her role in Seema (1955) garnered her wider recognition and the Filmfare Award for Best Actress. She continued playing leading roles through the 1960s until the late 1970s and went on to win the award on four other occasions for her roles in Sujata (1959), Bandini (1963), Milan (1967) and Main Tulsi Tere Aangan Ki (1978). Some of her other films of this period include Anari (1959), Chhalia (1960), Tere Ghar Ke Saamne (1963), Khandan (1965), Saraswatichandra (1968), Anuraag (1972) and Saudagar (1973).

In the 1980s, Nutan started playing character roles and continued working until shortly before her death. She portrayed mostly motherly roles in such films as Saajan Ki Saheli (1981), Meri Jung (1985) and Naam (1986). Her performance in Meri Jung earned her a sixth and final Filmfare Award, this time in the Best Supporting Actress category. Nutan was married to naval Lieutenant-Commander Rajnish Bahl from 1959 until her death from breast cancer in 1991. They had a son, Mohnish Bahl, who is a film and television actor.

Early life
Nutan Samarth was born on 4 June 1936 in Bombay into a Marathi Hindu Chandraseniya Kayastha Prabhu family as the eldest of four children to director-poet Kumarsen Samarth and his actress wife and filmmaker Shobhna. Kumarsen was one of the early developers of the Films Division of India. She grew up with complexes as she was considered too skinny in her childhood. She had two sisters: actress Tanuja and Chatura and a brother Jaideep. Her parents separated before Jaideep's birth.

As a child, Nutan went to Villa Theresa School and was later educated at the Baldwin Girls' High School in Bangalore. While she was attracted to the performing arts since childhood and liked singing and dancing, she liked arithmetic and geography at school. She took lessons in classical music for four years under Jagannath Prasad. In 1953, when her film career had already started, she headed to Switzerland for further studies at La Chatelaine, a finishing school. She was sent there at the behest of her mother following Nutan's intensive work in films and major weight loss. She described the one year spent there as the happiest in her life and returned home a year later having gained 22 pounds.

Career

Nutan first appeared briefly in front of the camera as a child in her father's film Nal Damyanti in 1945. She started her career at age 14 by playing the protagonist in Hamari Beti (1950), directed by her mother. She was conflicted during the making of the film, unsure she could pull it off given how critical she was of her appearance and talents. She took part in Snehal Bhatkar's soundtrack for the film, singing the song "Tujhe Kaisa Dulha Bhaaye Re". The film released to considerable attention for Nutan's work. The Motion Picture Magazine gave a scathing review of the film but took note of Nutan's "fine performance", which showed "great promise". She recalled an instance where her relatives changed their mind about her after watching the film: "The relatives who called me ugly changed their opinions overnight. They said they were proud of me."

Ravindra Dave's suspense thriller Nagina (1951) followed, and Nutan's performance in the film gained her greater recognition. The film became her first commercial success. Aged 15 at the time of its release, she was not allowed to attend its premiere as it was certified "A: (restricted for adults) and she was underage. The social drama Hum Log, released the same year, was similarly popular with audiences. Directed by Zia Sarhadi, the film dealt with the trials and tribulations of a middle-class family and starred Nutan as the daughter Paro, an aspiring writer who suffers from tuberculosis. Nagina and Hum Log consolidated her position as a rising star.

The following year, she participated at the 1952 Femina Miss India contest, where she was crowned Miss Mussoorie, before being sent to Switzerland for further studies due to her weight loss and frail appearance.

Her first big break was Seema (1955), for which she won her first Filmfare Award for Best Actress. She followed her success with a romantic comedy, Paying Guest, in which she co-starred with Dev Anand. By late 1950's she was an established star. In 1959, she starred in two hit films, Anari (with Raj Kapoor) and Bimal Roy's Sujata (with Sunil Dutt), for which she won her second Filmfare Award for Best Actress. In the 1960s and 1970s, she had many more successful films including Chhalia (1960), Saraswatichandra (1968), Devi (1970) and Main Tulsi Tere Aangan Ki (1978).

In 1960, she starred opposite Raj Kapoor once again in Manmohan Desai's Chhalia. which earned her a Filmfare nomination for Best Actress. In a film review at the time, Filmfare wrote: "As the unfortunate girl disowned by her relatives for no fault of hers, Nutan puts over a superb and memorable portrayal."

She formed a popular screen couple with co-star Dev Anand and the two acted in four films together – Paying Guest (1957), Baarish (1957), Manzil (1960) and Tere Ghar Ke Samne (1963).

Bimal Roy's socio-realist Bandini (1963) is based on Tamasi, a Bengali novel by Jarasandha, and stars Nutan as Kalyani, a young prisoner convicted for poisoning the wife of her lover (Ashok Kumar). The story follows her life in prison and how she is later faced with a choice between her past love and a young prison doctor (Dharmendra) who falls in love with her. Having quit acting after marriage, Nutan was persuaded to accept the part by Roy, who asserted that he would abandon the project if she refused. She was pregnant during the making of the film.

Bandini was a major critical success, and Nutan received career-best reviews for her portrayal, which is often cited as one of the finest performances of Indian cinema. The film won six awards at the 11th Filmfare Awards, including Best Film and a third Best Actress for Nutan. The Bengal Film Journalists' Association ranked Bandini as the third-best Indian film of the year and acknowledged Nutan with the Best Actress award in its Hindi section. Author and critic Dinesh Raheja wrote: "Sans screaming hysteria-niks, Nutan puts across one of the finest performances seen on Hindi screen. She recognised and was perfectly in tandem with Kalyani's innate strength of character."  In 2010, Filmfare included her performance in its "80 Iconic Performances" list. Anupama Chopra included the film in her list of "The 20 Best Hindi Films Ever Made", calling Kalyani "one of Hindi cinema's most complex and fully realized female characters", which was "the role of a lifetime" for Nutan, whose "face raged with a grand passion and a quiet grace". In 2013, Forbes India listed Nutan's performance as one of the "25 Greatest Acting Performances of Indian Cinema", hailing her work as "the best acting by a lead actress in Indian cinema".

Her fourth Filmfare win came for Milan (1967). She starred opposite Amitabh Bachchan in 1973's Saudagar (1973), for which she received a sixth Filmfare nomination and a third BFJA award. In 1978, she made an astonishing return to the screen as the righteous Sanjukta Chauhan in Main Tulsi Tere Aangan Ki (1978). For this performance, she received an eighth Filmfare nomination and won her fifth Filmfare Award for Best Actress, at the age of 42. She thus became a record holder in the category, having won five awards for Best Actress at Filmfare. At age 42, she is also the oldest winner of the award. Nutan was perhaps the only actress of her generation to command leading roles in her 40s, with tremendous success. Following this, she starred in Saajan Ki Saheli (1981), as an ignorant, jealous wife to a husband who knowingly befriends the daughter she abandoned at childbirth.

In the 1980s, she played roles in blockbuster films such as Meri Jung (1985), Naam (1986) and Karma (1986). Karma was notable for being the first time she was paired with actor Dilip Kumar. For Meri Jung, she won the Filmfare Award for Best Supporting Actress. Her last film released while she was alive was Kanoon Apna Apna in 1989. She died in 1991 of cancer. Two of her films Naseebwala (1992) and Insaniyat (1994) were released after her death. She also gave a stellar performance as Kaliganj Ki Bahu in the TV serial Mujrim Hazir, her only role on the small screen.

Personal life
Nutan married Lieutenant-Commander Rajnish Bahl of the Indian Navy on 11 October 1959. Their only son Mohnish, was born in 1961. He went on to become a television and film actor. His daughter (Nutan's granddaughter) Pranutan Bahl is also a Bollywood actress. Nutan was fond of hunting. Nutan was diagnosed and treated for breast cancer in 1990. In February 1991, she was admitted to Breach Candy Hospital in Mumbai after she fell ill. At the time, she was filming Garajna and Insaniyat. She died at 12:07 p.m. (IST) on 21 February. Her husband died from a fire accident in his apartment in 2004.

Legacy

Nutan was noted for her willingness to play unconventional roles and several of her roles were labelled "path-breaking". M.L. Dhawan from The Tribune wrote: "When squeakers and screamers ruled the roost, Nutan fine-tuned her dialogue delivery with an evocative voice. A natural throw was the hallmark of Nutan's dialogue delivery. She was low key and mellow as she was peppery and sarcastic and yet made a strong impact." According to Dhawan: "a fleeting expression on her face conveyed much more than dialogue," and he further noted her for accepting only roles in which "she either played the main part or at least shared equal footing with the male counterpart."

According to Encyclopædia Britannica, Nutan had "developed a natural acting style under Bimal Roy's direction." Actresses such as Sadhana and Smita Patil noted Nutan as their influence. Sadhana was once quoted as saying: "If there was any actress I modeled myself in the lines of it was the versatile Nutan in Seema, Sujata and Bandini. Parakh was a film where I really followed Nutan." Filmmaker Sanjay Leela Bhansali said of her: "They don't make actresses like her anymore." In 2011, Rediff.com listed her as the third-greatest actress of all-time. In 2013, while including her performance in Bandini in their list of "25 Greatest Acting Performances of Indian Cinema" , her performance was ranked highest in the female category, Forbes India observed, "Nutan's genius lay in portraying a whole range of emotions without resorting to over-the-top histrionics." Nutan's narrative is depicted in the book Nutan – Asen Mi Nasen Mi (meaning 'whether I will exist or not') written by famous Marathi author Lalita Tamhane. The book can be summarized as describing Nutan's life experiences, interactions with co-actors/family/friends, etc., as told by her to Lalita Tamhane. A postage stamp, bearing her photo, was released to honour her by India's Minister of State for Communication and Information Technology in February 2011. Google commemorated Nutan with a Doodle on her 81st birthday.

Awards and nominations

Civilian award
1974: Padma Shri, India's fourth-highest civilian honour by the Government of India.

Filmfare Awards
Best Actress

Best Supporting Actress

BFJA Awards
Best Actress (Hindi)

Filmography

References

Bibliography

External links

 

 Nutan Biography
 In-depth reviews of Nutan's filmography at Let's talk about Bollywood
 Nutan Biography

1936 births
1991 deaths
Actresses from Mumbai
Indian film actresses
Actresses in Hindi cinema
Femina Miss India winners
Marathi people
20th-century Indian actresses
Recipients of the Padma Shri in arts
Filmfare Awards winners
Female models from Mumbai
Deaths from breast cancer